The Ladies of Soul is a Dutch supergroup that was founded by Candy Dulfer, Berget Lewis, Glennis Grace and Edsilia Rombley. Trijntje Oosterhuis, a former founding member, left in 2017 to focus on her solo-career.

History

Origins
The Ladies of Soul have shared childhoods; Oosterhuis and Lewis were neighbours, Rombley and Lewis became best friends and Oosterhuis and Dulfer were connected through relatives. They ended up pursuing careers in music and making guest appearances at each other's performances. 

All five of them got together in 2012 for a successful series of Whitney Houston memorial concerts. These were organized by Oosterhuis' brother Tjeerd (Rombley's husband). Other singers to appear in "In remembrance of Whitney Houston" were Do, Leona Philippo and Tania Kross. 

By popular demand, the Ladies continued their collaboration with Tjeerd Oosterhuis for a big event. This resulted in 2014, in a Valentine Day's concert at Amsterdam's Ziggo Dome, dubbed Ladies of Soul. 

Do was to join as a sixth member but it never happened; on January 21, 2017, she revealed on the RTL Boulevard-show that she was recovering from her first pregnancy while the others endured tight rehearsing schedules. It has never been explained why Kross didn't join. Only Philippo, winning contester of The Voice of Holland, was invited as a special guest at the first edition.

In November 2013, the Ladies issued a single, I'll Carry You, as a teaser for their two sold-out concerts on February 13 and 14, 2014. These concerts were successfully recorded for cd- and DVD release. 

In 2015 and 2016, the Ladies played four shows each year; three in Amsterdam and one in Belgium at Antwerp's Lotto Arena, featuring Natalia Druyts as a special guest. The 2015 shows were promoted by the single Up Till Now. Oosterhuis was unavailable for the 2016 show in Antwerp because of her pregnancy.

In 2017, the Ladies finally sold out all three nights at the Ziggo Dome. Four months later in June, Oosterhuis announced her departure; she wanted to focus on her solo-career and explore new grounds that didn't fit the Ladies' image. Oosterhuis made a guest appearance at the 5th anniversary shows on March 23 and 24, 2018.

The remaining Ladies appeared in an NPO 2 documentary following their preparations for the 2019 leg, as well as their solo careers.

In 2020, the Ladies announced a show for November 20, but due to the corona-pandemic, it was rescheduled to July 2, 2021.

On February 12, 2021 the Ladies released a cover-version of Leo Sayer's When I Need You.

Members 
 Edsilia Rombley (aka Lady E)
 Candy Dulfer (aka Lady C)
 Glennis Grace (aka Lady G)
 Berget Lewis (aka Lady B)

Former member 
 Trijntje Oosterhuis (aka Lady T; 2012–17)

Discography 
Live albums:
 2014 Ziggo Presents: Ladies of Soul Live At The Ziggo Dome  
 2015 Ziggo Presents: Ladies of Soul Live At The Ziggo Dome   
 2016 Ziggo Presents: Ladies of Soul Live At The Ziggo Dome 
 2017 Ziggo Presents: Ladies of Soul Live At The Ziggo Dome

Singles:
 I'll Carry You - 2013
 Up Till Now - 2014 
 Feel Good - 2015 
 Higher - 2015

Video/DVD:
 2014 Ziggo Presents: Ladies of Soul Live At The Ziggo Dome  
 2015 Ziggo Presents: Ladies of Soul Live At The Ziggo Dome   
 2016 Ziggo Presents: Ladies of Soul Live At The Ziggo Dome 
 2017 Ziggo Presents: Ladies of Soul Live At The Ziggo Dome
 2018 Ziggo Presents: Ladies of Soul Live At The Ziggo Dome

References

External links 
 Official site

Dutch girl groups